In English common law, fee tail or entail is a form of trust, established by deed or settlement, that restricts the sale or inheritance of an estate in real property and prevents that property from being sold, devised by will, or otherwise alienated by the tenant-in-possession, and instead causes it to pass automatically, by operation of law, to an heir determined by the settlement deed. The term fee tail is from  Medieval Latin , which means "cut(-short) fee". Fee tail deeds are in contrast to "fee simple" deeds, possessors of which have an unrestricted title to the property, and are empowered to bequeath or dispose of it as they wish (although it may be subject to the allodial title of a monarch or of a governing body with the power of eminent domain). Equivalent legal concepts exist or formerly existed in many other European countries and elsewhere.

Purpose
The fee tail allowed a patriarch to perpetuate his blood-line, family-name, honour and armorials in the persons of a series of powerful and wealthy male descendants. By keeping his estate intact in the hands of one heir alone, in an ideally indefinite and pre-ordained chain of succession, his own wealth, power and family honour would not be dissipated amongst several male lines, as became the case for example in Napoleonic France by operation of the Napoleonic Code which gave each child the legal right to inherit an equal share of the patrimony, where a formerly great landowning family could be reduced in a few generations to a series of small-holders or peasant farmers. It therefore approaches the true corporation which is a legal body or person which does not die and continues in existence and can hold wealth indefinitely. Indeed, as a form of trust, whilst the individual trustees may die, replacements are appointed and the trust itself continues, ideally indefinitely. In England almost seamless successions were made from patriarch to patriarch, the smoothness of which were often enhanced by baptising the eldest son and heir with his father's Christian name for several generations, for example the FitzWarin family, all named Fulk. Such indefinite inalienable land-holdings were soon seen as restrictive on the optimum productive ability of land, which was often converted to deer-parks or pleasure grounds by the wealthy tenant-in-possession, which was damaging to the nation as a whole, and thus laws against perpetuities were enacted, which restricted entails to a maximum number of lives.

An entail also had the effect of disallowing illegitimate children from inheriting. It created complications for many propertied families, especially from about the late 17th to the early 19th century, leaving many individuals wealthy in land but heavily in debt, often due to annuities chargeable on the estate payable to the patriarch's widow and younger children, where the patriarch was swayed by sentiment not to establish a strict concentration of all his wealth in his heir leaving his other beloved relatives destitute. Frequently in such cases the generosity of the settlor left the entailed estate as an uneconomical enterprise, especially during times when the estate's fluctuating agricultural income had to provide for fixed sum annuities. Such impoverished tenants-in-possession were unable to realise in cash any part of their land or even to offer the property as security for a loan, to pay such annuities, unless sanctioned by private Act of Parliament  allowing such sale, which expensive and time-consuming mechanism was frequently resorted to. The beneficial owner (or tenant-in-possession) of the property in fact had only a life interest in it, albeit an absolute right to the income it generated, the legal owners being the trustees of the settlement, with the remainder passing intact to the next successor or heir in law; any purported bequest of the land by the tenant-in-possession was ineffective.

History
Fee tail was established during feudal times by landed gentry to attempt to ensure that the high social standing of the family, as represented by a single patriarch, continued indefinitely. The concentration of the family's wealth into the hands of a single representative was essential to support this  process. Unless the heir had himself inherited the personal and intellectual strengths of the original great patriarch, often a great warrior, which alone had brought him from obscurity to greatness, he would soon sink again into obscurity, and required wealth to maintain his social standing. This feature of English gentry and aristocracy differs from the aristocracy which existed in pre-Revolution France, where all sons of a nobleman inherited his title and were thus inescapably members of a separate noble caste in society.  In England, primogeniture provided that an estate would be inherited entirely by the first-born legitimate son of a nobleman and that, accordingly, subsequent sons were born as mere gentlemen and commoners.  Without the support of wealth, these younger sons might quickly descend into obscurity, and often did. On this eldest son was concentrated the honour of the family, and to him alone was granted all its wealth to support his role in that regard, by the process of the fee tail.

The effects of English primogeniture and entail have been significant plot details or themes in a number of notable works of English literature. (See some examples cited below.)

Statute of Westminster 1285
The Statute of Westminster II, passed in 1285, created and fixed the form of this estate. The new law was also formally called the statute De Donis Conditionalibus (Concerning Conditional Gifts).

Opponents
Fee tail was  never popular with the monarchy, the merchant class and many holders of entailed estates themselves who wished to sell or divide their land.

Abolition
Fee tail as a legal estate in England was abolished by the Law of Property Act 1925.

Continuing use
A fee tail can still exist in England and Wales as an equitable interest, behind a strict settlement; the legal estate is vested in the current 'tenant for life' or other person immediately entitled to the income, but on the basis that any capital money arising must be paid to the settlement trustees. A tenant in tail in possession can bar his fee tail by a simple disentailing deed, which does not now have to be enrolled. A tenant in tail in reversion (i.e., a future interest where the property is subject to prior life interest) needs the consent of the life tenant and any 'special protectors' to vest a reversionary fee simple in himself. Otherwise he can only create a base fee; a base fee only confers a right to the property on its owner, when its creator would have become entitled to it; if its creator dies before he would have received it, the owner of the base fee gets nothing.   No new "fees tail" can now be created following the Trusts of Land and Appointment of Trustees Act 1996.

In the US, conservation easements are a form of entail still in use.

Creation
Traditionally, a fee tail was created by a trust established in a deed, often a marriage settlement, or in a will "to A and the heirs of his body". The crucial difference between the words of conveyance and the words that created a fee simple ("to A and his heirs") is that the heirs "in tail" must be the children begotten by the landowner. It was also possible to have "fee tail male", which only sons could inherit, and "fee tail female", which only daughters could inherit; and "fee tail special", which had a further condition of inheritance, usually restricting succession to certain "heirs of the body" and excluding others. Land subject to these conditions was said to be "entailed" or "held in-tail", with the restrictions themselves known as entailments.

Breaking of fee tail
The breaking of a fee tail was simplified by the Fines and Recoveries Act 1833, which replaced the conveyance for making a tenant to the praecipe for suffering a common recovery. This was the usual preliminary to a recovery with a disentailing assurance, which had to be enrolled. The need for this to be followed by the fictitious proceeding of a common recovery was abolished.

The requirement that a disentailing assurance should be enrolled was abolished in 1926.

Mortgage of entailed lands
Lending upon security of a mortgage on land in fee tail was risky, since at the death of the tenant-in-possession, his personal estate ceased to have any right to the estate or to the income it generated. The absolute right to the income generated by the estate passed by operation of law to parties who had no legal obligation to the lender, who therefore could not enforce payment of interest on the new tenants-in-possession. The largest estate a possessor in fee tail could convey to someone else was an estate for the term of the grantor's own life. If all went as planned, it was therefore  impossible for the succession of patriarchs to lose the land, which was the idea.

Failure of issue

Things did not always go as planned, however. Tenants-in-possession of entailed estates occasionally suffered "failure of issue" – that is, they had no legitimate children surviving them at the time of their deaths. In this situation the entailed land devolved to male cousins, i.e., back up and through the family tree to legitimate male descendants of former tenants-in-possession, or reverted to the last owner in fee simple, if still living. This situation produced complicated litigation and was an incentive for the production and maintenance of detailed and authoritative family pedigrees and supporting records of marriage, births, baptisms etc.

Depending on how the original deed or grant was worded, in the event of there being daughters but no sons, all the sisters might inherit jointly, it might pass to the eldest sister, it might be held in trust until one of them should produce a (legitimate) son, or it might pass to the next male-line relative (an uncle, say, or even a cousin, sometimes very distant). The last possibility, commonly called 'entailment to heirs male', is used in Jane Austen's Pride and Prejudice; the estate of Longbourn is entailed to a distant male cousin rather than the incumbent's five daughters or their offspring.

Common recovery
In the 15th century, lawyers devised  "common recovery", an elaborate legal procedure which used collaborative lawsuits and legal fictions to "bar" a fee tail, that is to say to remove the restrictions of fee tail from land and to enable its conveyance in fee simple.  Biancalana's book The Fee Tail and the Common Recovery in Medieval England: 1176–1502 (2001) discusses the procedure and its history at length.

Resettlement
In the 17th and 18th centuries the practice arose whereby when the son came of age (at 21), he and his father acting together could bar the existing fee tail, and could then re-settle the land in fee tail, again on the father for life, then to the son for life and his heirs male successively, but at the same time making provision for annuities chargeable on the estate for the father's widow, daughters and younger sons, and most importantly, and as an incentive for the son to participate in the re-settlement, an income for the son during his father's lifetime. This process effectively evaded the law against perpetuities, as the entail in law had been terminated, but in practice continued. In this way an estate could stay in a family for many generations, yet emerged on re-settlement often fatally weakened, or much more susceptible to agricultural downturns, from the onerous annuities now chargeable on it.

Formedon
Formedon (or form down etc.) was a right of writ exercisable by a holder in fee for claiming property entailed by a lessee beyond the terms of his feoffment. A letter dated 1539 from the Lisle Letters describes the circumstances of its use:I received your ladyship's letter by which ye willed me to speak with my Lady Coffyn for her title in East Haggynton in the county of Devon who had one estate in tail to him and to his heirs of her body begotten; and now he is dead without issue of his body so that the reversion should revert to Mr John Basset and to his heirs so there be no let nor discontinuance of the same made by Sir William Coffyn in his life. Howbeit Mr Richard Coffyn, next heir to Sir William Coffyn, claimeth the same by his uncle's feoffment to him and to his heirs so that the law will put Mr John Basset from his entry and to compel him to take his action of form down which is much dilatory as Mr Basset knoweth

Historical examples

Marquess of Hertford
An English example of a fee tail may be the main estates of the wealthy art collector Richard Seymour-Conway, 4th Marquess of Hertford (d. 1870). His only child was his illegitimate son, Sir Richard Wallace, 1st Baronet, to whom he left as much of his property as he could. The main land holdings and Ragley Hall were inherited by his distant cousin, Francis Seymour, 5th Marquess of Hertford, descended from a younger son of the 1st Marquess who had died in 1794. Most of the 4th Marquess's art collection had been acquired by himself or his father, went to Wallace, and is now the Wallace Collection. Other works were covered by the fee tail, however, and passed to the 5th Marquess.

Earl of Pembroke
Another example was George Herbert, 11th Earl of Pembroke, who died in 1827. He had quarreled with his eldest son, later the 12th Earl, and left his unentailed estate to Sidney Herbert, 1st Baron Herbert of Lea, his son by a second marriage.

Fees tail in fiction
Fees tail figure in the plots of several well known novels and stories, particularly in the 19th century, including:

 Pride and Prejudice by Jane Austen
 Middlemarch by George Eliot
 The Belton Estate (1866) and Ralph the Heir (1871) by Anthony Trollope
 The Master of Ballantrae by Robert Louis Stevenson
 Kidnapped by Robert Louis Stevenson mentions it by implication in a dispute over the House of Shaws that drives the plot
 The Adventure of the Priory School by Sir Arthur Conan Doyle
 Brideshead Revisited by Evelyn Waugh
 Wideacre by Philippa Gregory
 The Quincunx by Charles Palliser (written in 1989, but it takes the form of a Dickensian mystery set in early-19th-century England)
 Downton Abbey by Julian Fellowes (written in 2009–2015, but set in England in the period 1912–1927)
 To Kill a Mockingbird by Harper Lee (referred to as an "entailment")
 Wives and Daughters  by Elizabeth Gaskell

Pride and Prejudice
Pride and Prejudice contains a particularly thorny example of the kind of problems which could arise through the entailing of property. Mr. Bennet, the father of protagonist Elizabeth Bennet, had only a life interest in the Longbourn estate, the family's home and principal source of income. He had no authority to dictate to whom it should pass upon his death, as it was strictly arranged to be inherited by the next male heir. Had Mr. Bennet fathered a son it would have passed to him, but since he did not it could not pass to any of his five daughters. Instead, the next nearest male heir would inherit the property—Mr. Bennet's cousin, William Collins, a boorish minister in his mid-twenties. The inheritance of the Longbourn property completely excluded the five Bennet daughters, who were thus to lose their home and income upon their father's death. The need for the daughters to make a good marriage to ensure their future security is a key motivation for many episodes in the novel. Many fees tail arose from wills, rather than from marriage settlements which usually made some provision for daughters. Austen was very familiar with the law of entail; her brother, Edward, had inherited similarly entailed estates at Chawton, Godmersham and Winchester from distant cousins under the will of Elizabeth Knight, who died in 1737.

Law professor Maureen B. Collins (2017) cites several other authors debating the accuracy of  Austen's depiction of the entailment, including Appel (2013), Treitel (1984), Redmond (1989), and Grover (2014).

Other countries

Scotland

In Scotland, the Abolition of Feudal Tenure etc. (Scotland) Act 2000 (section 50) abolished all feudal tenures including the entail. Today, the doctrines of legitim and jus relictae restrict owners from willing property out of their family when they die with children or have a surviving partner.

A Scottish example of fee tail is the case of Alfred Douglas-Hamilton, 13th Duke of Hamilton, who in 1895 inherited from the 12th Duke, his fourth cousin, who had attempted to marry his daughter to the heir.

Ireland
In the Republic of Ireland, Section 13 of the Land and Conveyancing Law Reform Act 2009 largely abolished the fee tail and converted existing fees tail to fees simple. For constitutional reasons, this section is subject to a saving clause which prevents the conversion of fees tail to fees simple where the protector of the settlement is still alive. Therefore, some fees tail still exist in the state.

United States
The fee tail has been abolished in all but four states in the United States: Massachusetts, Maine, Delaware and Rhode Island. However, in the first three states, property can be sold or deeded as any other property would be, with the fee tail only applying in case of death without a will. In Rhode Island, a fee tail is treated as a life estate with remainder in the life tenant's children. New York abolished fee tail in 1782, while many other states within the U.S. never recognized it at all. In most states in the United States, an attempt to create a fee tail results in a fee simple; even in those four states that still allow fee tail, the estate holder may convert his fee tail to a fee simple during his lifetime by executing a deed.

In Louisiana, the common law concept of estates in land never existed.  The concept of forced heirship and the marital portion protects force heirs and surviving spouses from total divestment of value of the estate of the decedent, who has a duty to provide for their care.

Fee tail-like restrictions still exist though contractual obligations. For example, owners of inholdings inside public lands may be prevented from selling or giving their land to non-family members. In this case, the restrictions result from an agreement between the government and the land owner, and is not a part of a deed or settlement.

Polish–Lithuanian Commonwealth
In the Kingdom of Poland and later in the Polish–Lithuanian Commonwealth, fee tail estates were called ordynacja (landed property in fideicommis). Ordynacja was an economic institution for governing of landed property introduced in late 16th century by king Stefan Batory. Ordynacja was abolished by the agricultural reform in the People's Republic of Poland. Ordynat was the title of the principal heir of ordynacja.

According to the rules of ordynacja, which became a statute approved by the Sejm, the estate was not to be divided between the heirs but inherited in full by the eldest son (primogeniture). Women were excluded from inheritance (Salic Law). Ordynacja could not be sold or mortgaged.

Ordynacja was similar to the French law of majorat or German and Scandinavian fideicommis, and succession to such resembles that of British peerages.

Many Polish magnates' fortunes were based on ordynacja, among them those of the Radziwiłłs, Zamoyskis, Czartoryskis, Potockis and Lubomirskis. Most important ordynacja were veritable little principalities. The earliest and most extensive ordynacjas include:
 Ordynacje Radziwiłłów, created for Mikołaj VII Radziwiłł, Albrecht Radziwiłł and Stanisław Radziwiłł in 1589, centered on Olyka, Nesvizh, and Kletsk
 , created for Janusz Ostrogski in 1609, later inherited by the Zaslawski, Lubomirski and Sanguszko families, centered on Ostroh
 Ordynacja Zamojska, created for Jan Zamoyski in 1589, centered on Zamość
 Ordynacja Jarosławska, created for Rafał Jarosławski in 1470, centered on Jarosław
 Ordynacja Pińczowska, created for Piotr and Zygmunt Myszkowski in 1601, later inherited by the Wielopolski family, centered on Pińczów

Other
Other European legal systems had comparable devices to keep estates together, especially in Spain and Northern European countries like Prussia. They are derived from fideicommissum, a legal institution in Roman law. Unlike most of the English aristocracy, the Prussian junkers supported fees tail, and succeeded in reinstating them in 1853, after they had been abolished in a recent Constitution. In Germany and Austria the Familienfideikommiss was only abolished in 1938, and in Scandinavia they persisted even later – a few old Swedish fees tail still remain in force, though no new ones may be established. For the law of German and Austrian fideicommissa in particular, an 862-page manual by the German legal scholar Philipp Knipschildt, entitled Tractatus de fideicommissis nobilium familiarum – von Stammgütern, was the standard reference work. First published in 1654, this grand systematization of existing legal opinion was frequently reprinted and continued to be consulted until well into the 19th century.

See also
 Fee simple
 Majorat
 Primogeniture
 Reichserbhofgesetz
 Rule in Wild's Case
 Tailzie (Scots law)
 Taltarum's Case
 Easement

References

Further reading
 The Fee Tail and the Common Recovery in Medieval England 1176–1502, by: Joseph Biancalana, University of Cincinnati
 
 
 

Inheritance
Legal history
Real property law
Scots law legal terminology
Land tenure